Kristen Hager  is a Canadian actress. She co-starred in films Aliens vs. Predator: Requiem (2007) and Wanted (2008), and played Leslie Van Houten in the independent film Leslie, My Name Is Evil (2009). From 2011 to 2014, Hager starred as Nora Sergeant in the Syfy supernatural comedy-drama series, Being Human.

Life and career
Hager made her first television appearance in the Lifetime mini-series where she gained a role on the Beach Girls in 2005. The following year, Hager had the recurring role on the short-lived The CW series, Runaway. In 2007, she had a small part in the biographical drama film I'm Not There, and in the same year played one of the female leads in the science-fiction action horror film Aliens vs. Predator: Requiem, the sequel to Alien vs. Predator. In 2008, she played James McAvoy's character's girlfriend in the action thriller, Wanted.

In 2009, Hager played the leading role in the independent film Leslie, My Name Is Evil about Leslie Van Houten. She had a supporting role in the Canadian family drama series, Wild Roses, and starred as the lead character in the MTV miniseries Valemont. In 2011, she was cast as Nora Sergeant in the Syfy supernatural comedy-drama series, Being Human. The series ended after four seasons in 2014. Hager also appeared in the films A Little Bit Zombie (2012), The Right Kind of Wrong (2013) and The Barber. In 2015, Hager was cast as a lead character on the ABC drama pilot The Adversaries, about a New York legal dynasty, co-starring alongside Christine Lahti and Terry O'Quinn.

Filmography

Film

Television

Personal life
On December 21, 2020, she married actor Matt Jones. They have 1 daughter together, Jolene (born 2022).

References

External links

Canadian film actresses
Canadian people of Swedish descent
Canadian television actresses
Living people
21st-century Canadian actresses
Canadian expatriate actresses in the United States
1983 births